Football is the most popular sport in Greece, followed by basketball.

History of Greek football

The Ancient Greeks are known to have played many ball games, some of which involved the use of the feet. The Roman game harpastum is believed to have been adapted from a Greek team game known as "ἐπίσκυρος" (Episkyros) or "φαινίνδα" (phaininda), which is mentioned by a Greek playwright, Antiphanes (388–311 BC) and later referred to by the Christian theologian Clement of Alexandria (c.150-c.215 AD). These games appear to have resembled rugby football.

In the modern era, however, association football was introduced to the Greeks by expatriate British communities and military personnel. The first Greek football teams were created as part of long-established athletic and gymnastic clubs in the major port cities of Athens and Thessaloniki, as well as among the large Greek communities of the Ottoman Empire, such as Constantinople and Smyrna, in the early 1900s. After the Asia Minor Disaster of 1922 which resulted in a large resettlement of Greeks from Turkey to Greece, several clubs, such as Panionios and Apollon Smyrnis, were transplanted, while many athletes of other clubs, like Pera, formed new organizations in their new home (e.g. AEK, PAOK).

League system
The first league of professional football in Greece was officially established as the Panhellenic Championship in 1927. The league ran until 1959, when it was replaced by the Alpha Ethniki which ran until 2006 when it was then replaced by Superleague Greece. According to FIFPro, an organization that represents professional players, nearly 70 percent of players complained in a 2011 survey of problems with not being paid.

Superleague Greece is the top-flight professional football division within Greece. The league contains 14 clubs, with the winners of the league becoming the Champions of Greece. The team with the most national championships is Olympiacos, who have won 47 times - 13 Super League titles, 19 Alpha Ethniki titles and 15 Panhellenic Championships.  Two other P.O.K. clubs also dominate the history of Greek football; Panathinaikos with 20 titles and AEK Athens with 12 titles.

Cup competitions
There is currently one major cup competition in Greek football, the Greek Cup. It includes clubs from every division of football in Greece. Until 2008, another major cup competition was the Greek Super Cup, an annual game held between the winner of the Greek Super League and Greek Cup.

International

UEFA competitions

Club sides may qualify to play in European tournaments under the jurisdiction of UEFA. The champions of Super League qualify for the Group Stage of the following season's UEFA Champions' League. The teams finishing in second to fifth position qualify for a round-robin playoff, the winner of which will enter the Champions League at the Third Qualifying Round. The other three teams will qualify for the following season's UEFA Europa League, at the Play-off, Third Qualifying or Second Qualifying Round stage, dependent on their performance in the national level playoff. The winner of the Greek Cup also qualifies for the Europa League. If this club has already qualified for a UEFA competition then the place is given to the runners-up.

The only Greek team to have reached the final of a UEFA competition is Panathinaikos, who were European Cup runners-up in 1970–71.

National team

The Greek national team's first match came on April 7, 1929 in a 1-4 loss to Italy. Greece have qualified for the FIFA World Cup three times, in 1994, in 2010 and in 2014. Greece have qualified for the European Championship four times, their first in 1980, their second in 2004, their third in 2008 and their fourth in 2012. 2004 was their most successful run as they became champions by defeating hosts Portugal in the finals.

Women's football

A national league for women has existed since 1987. Now known as the Greek football women A Division, it was started in 1987 as the Pan-Hellenic Championship. In recent years PAOK have dominated the league.

Greek footballers

Records

Professional seasons in Greek football

See also
 
Episkyros
Greek football clubs in European competitions
List of football stadiums in Greece
Sport in Greece

References